Boldrini is an Italian surname. Notable people with the surname include:

Andrea Boldrini (1971), Italian racing driver
Arrigo Boldrini (1915–2008), Italian politician and partisan
Laura Boldrini (born 1961), Italian journalist and politician, president of the Chamber of Deputies in Italy
Leonardo Boldrini (16th century), Italian Renaissance painter
Marcello Boldrini (1890–1969), Italian statistician
Niccolò Boldrini (c.1500–c.1566), Italian Renaissance engraver

Italian-language surnames